Felypressin is a non-catecholamine vasoconstrictor that is chemically related to vasopressin, the posterior pituitary hormone. It is added to some local anaesthetics such as prilocaine in a concentration of 0.03 IU/ml. Felypressin is a Vasopressin 1 agonist, and will thus have effects at all Arginine vasopressin receptor 1As. It will, however, have its main physiological effects on vascular SMC's due to the form in which it is administered.

V1 receptors are found in various sites around the body.  The major points include the CNS, Liver, Anterior Pituitary, Muscle (both vascular and non-vascular smooth muscle), and Platelets (CLAMP).

Another example of a V1 agonist is terlipressin - which is used in oesophageal varices.

References

"Vasopressin analogues and treatments", Prof Buckingham, Imperial College School of Medicine (ICSM) - adapted by JHPatel

Vasoconstrictors
Peptides
Vasopressin receptor agonists